Glossomastix is a genus of heterokont.

It includes a single species, Glossomastix chrysoplasta.

References

Ochrophyta
Heterokont genera
Monotypic algae genera